Roxanne Barton Conlin (born June 30, 1944) is an American lawyer who served as United States Attorney for the Southern District of Iowa from 1977 to 1981. A Democrat, she was a candidate for Governor of Iowa in 1982 and for United States Senate in 2010 but was not elected to either post.

Education and early career
Conlin was born to Marion W. and Alyce M. Barton on June 30, 1944 in Huron, South Dakota. Conlin and her family moved to Sioux City, Clinton, and then Des Moines, Iowa in 1958. She attended Drake University in Des Moines, earning a B.A., J.D. and M.P.A. She married James Conlin in 1964 and has four children.

After working as a lawyer for three years, she served as Deputy Industrial Commissioner in Des Moines from 1967 to 1968, then an Assistant Attorney General for the state of Iowa for seven years (1969–1976). She headed the Civil Rights Section of the Iowa Department of Justice.

Later legal and political career
Jimmy Carter appointed Conlin as United States Attorney for the Southern District of Iowa in May, 1977, making her one of the first women ever appointed as a US Attorney. She was confirmed by the Senate in early June, 1977. She was sworn in on June 6, 1977, and received her commission the next day on June 7, 1977. She decided to step down from the court in early 1981.

Conlin has served as the first female president of the Association of Trial Lawyers of America (ATLA). She also founded and was the first chair of the Iowa Women's Political Caucus and served as president of NOW's Legal Defense and Education Fund. Conlin has been involved in the Iowa Democratic Party, serving for a short time as state chair, and ran unsuccessfully for governor of Iowa in 1982.

Conlin currently practices law at Roxanne Conlin & Associates, P.C. in Des Moines.

2010 U.S. Senate campaign

In October 2009, she announced she was running in the Democratic primary for U.S. Senate in 2010 against Bob Krause and Tom Fiegen. In the primary, she was criticized for being unwilling to debate her primary opponents. Conlin later criticized her Republican opponent in the general election for his unwillingness to debate her. During the primary campaign, Conlin also faced criticism for avoiding questions about her stance on platform issues. Questioned in an April 28 live chat, sponsored by GazetteOnline.com, about disagreements with the Democratic party platform, Conlin answered she could not know the party platform because it would not be adopted until June 2010. When it was pointed out that the current party platform was ratified at the 2008 state convention and is the party platform until superseded, she had no response.

Conlin later lost the November 2010 general election against six-term Republican incumbent Chuck Grassley.

References

External links
Roxanne Conlin & Associates law firm
Roxanne for Iowa official campaign site
 
Campaign contributions at OpenSecrets.org

|-

1944 births
Drake University alumni
Iowa Democrats
Iowa lawyers
Living people
People from Huron, South Dakota
United States Attorneys for the Southern District of Iowa
Women in Iowa politics
Candidates in the 1982 United States elections
Candidates in the 2010 United States elections
People from Des Moines, Iowa
20th-century American lawyers
21st-century American lawyers
20th-century American women lawyers
21st-century American women lawyers
Drake University Law School alumni